The Canadian federal budget for fiscal year 1969-1970 presented by Minister of Finance Edgar Benson in the House of Commons of Canada on 3 June 1969. This was Canada's last balanced budget  until Paul Martin's budget of 1997-98.

External links 

 Budget Speech

References

Canadian budgets
1969 in Canadian law
1969 government budgets
1969 in Canadian politics